The 1980–81 Pittsburgh Penguins season was their 14th in the National Hockey League.

Regular season

Division standings

Schedule and results

|- style="background:#fcf;"
| 1 || Oct 9 || Pittsburgh Penguins || 4–7 || Philadelphia Flyers || The Spectrum || 0–1–0 || 0
|- style="background:#cfc;"
| 2 || Oct 11 || Winnipeg Jets || 4–5 || Pittsburgh Penguins || Civic Arena || 1–1–0 || 2
|- style="background:#cfc;"
| 3 || Oct 12 || Pittsburgh Penguins || 6–3 || New York Rangers || Madison Square Garden (IV) || 2–1–0 || 4
|- style="background:#fcf;"
| 4 || Oct 15 || Hartford Whalers || 5–2 || Pittsburgh Penguins || Civic Arena || 2–2–0 || 4
|- style="background:#fcf;"
| 5 || Oct 18 || Buffalo Sabres || 4–2 || Pittsburgh Penguins || Civic Arena || 2–3–0 || 4
|- style="background:#fcf;"
| 6 || Oct 21 || Pittsburgh Penguins || 5–8 || Toronto Maple Leafs || Maple Leaf Gardens || 2–4–0 || 4
|- style="background:#cfc;"
| 7 || Oct 22 || St. Louis Blues || 3–9 || Pittsburgh Penguins || Civic Arena || 3–4–0 || 6
|- style="background:#fcf;"
| 8 || Oct 25 || Calgary Flames || 8–2 || Pittsburgh Penguins || Civic Arena || 3–5–0 || 6
|- style="background:#ffc;"
| 9 || Oct 29 || Pittsburgh Penguins || 1–1 || Buffalo Sabres || Buffalo Memorial Auditorium || 3–5–1 || 7
|- style="background:#cfc;"
| 10 || Oct 31 || Pittsburgh Penguins || 6–5 || Winnipeg Jets || Winnipeg Arena || 4–5–1 || 9
|-

|- style="background:#fcf;"
| 11 || Nov 1 || Pittsburgh Penguins || 3–6 || Minnesota North Stars || Met Center || 4–6–1 || 9
|- style="background:#ffc;"
| 12 || Nov 3 || Pittsburgh Penguins || 4–4 || Edmonton Oilers || Northlands Coliseum || 4–6–2 || 10
|- style="background:#fcf;"
| 13 || Nov 5 || Toronto Maple Leafs || 2–1 || Pittsburgh Penguins || Civic Arena || 4–7–2 || 10
|- style="background:#cfc;"
| 14 || Nov 8 || Detroit Red Wings || 3–5 || Pittsburgh Penguins || Civic Arena || 5–7–2 || 12
|- style="background:#fcf;"
| 15 || Nov 9 || Pittsburgh Penguins || 4–7 || Boston Bruins || Boston Garden || 5–8–2 || 12
|- style="background:#fcf;"
| 16 || Nov 12 || Washington Capitals || 3–1 || Pittsburgh Penguins || Civic Arena || 5–9–2 || 12
|- style="background:#ffc;"
| 17 || Nov 14 || Pittsburgh Penguins || 3–3 || New York Rangers || Madison Square Garden (IV) || 5–9–3 || 13
|- style="background:#fcf;"
| 18 || Nov 15 || Boston Bruins || 7–4 || Pittsburgh Penguins || Civic Arena || 5–10–3 || 13
|- style="background:#fcf;"
| 19 || Nov 19 || Minnesota North Stars || 3–2 || Pittsburgh Penguins || Civic Arena || 5–11–3 || 13
|- style="background:#cfc;"
| 20 || Nov 22 || Colorado Rockies || 2–4 || Pittsburgh Penguins || Civic Arena || 6–11–3 || 15
|- style="background:#fcf;"
| 21 || Nov 26 || Vancouver Canucks || 7–4 || Pittsburgh Penguins || Civic Arena || 6–12–3 || 15
|- style="background:#ffc;"
| 22 || Nov 27 || Pittsburgh Penguins || 3–3 || Boston Bruins || Boston Garden || 6–12–4 || 16
|- style="background:#fcf;"
| 23 || Nov 29 || New York Rangers || 4–2 || Pittsburgh Penguins || Civic Arena || 6–13–4 || 16
|-

|- style="background:#ffc;"
| 24 || Dec 3 || Pittsburgh Penguins || 4–4 || Toronto Maple Leafs || Maple Leaf Gardens || 6–13–5 || 17
|- style="background:#cfc;"
| 25 || Dec 4 || Pittsburgh Penguins || 3–2 || Montreal Canadiens || Montreal Forum || 7–13–5 || 19
|- style="background:#cfc;"
| 26 || Dec 6 || Chicago Black Hawks || 4–6 || Pittsburgh Penguins || Civic Arena || 8–13–5 || 21
|- style="background:#fcf;"
| 27 || Dec 7 || Pittsburgh Penguins || 1–10 || Buffalo Sabres || Buffalo Memorial Auditorium || 8–14–5 || 21
|- style="background:#cfc;"
| 28 || Dec 10 || Montreal Canadiens || 3–4 || Pittsburgh Penguins || Civic Arena || 9–14–5 || 23
|- style="background:#cfc;"
| 29 || Dec 12 || Pittsburgh Penguins || 6–2 || Washington Capitals || Capital Centre || 10–14–5 || 25
|- style="background:#fcf;"
| 30 || Dec 13 || Philadelphia Flyers || 6–5 || Pittsburgh Penguins || Civic Arena || 10–15–5 || 25
|- style="background:#ffc;"
| 31 || Dec 17 || Pittsburgh Penguins || 3–3 || Los Angeles Kings || The Forum || 10–15–6 || 26
|- style="background:#fcf;"
| 32 || Dec 19 || Pittsburgh Penguins || 4–10 || Vancouver Canucks || Pacific Coliseum || 10–16–6 || 26
|- style="background:#ffc;"
| 33 || Dec 20 || Pittsburgh Penguins || 3–3 || Calgary Flames || Stampede Corral || 10–16–7 || 27
|- style="background:#fcf;"
| 34 || Dec 23 || Pittsburgh Penguins || 3–6 || St. Louis Blues || The Checkerdome || 10–17–7 || 27
|- style="background:#fcf;"
| 35 || Dec 26 || Pittsburgh Penguins || 7–9 || Hartford Whalers || XL Center || 10–18–7 || 27
|- style="background:#cfc;"
| 36 || Dec 27 || Quebec Nordiques || 4–6 || Pittsburgh Penguins || Civic Arena || 11–18–7 || 29
|- style="background:#fcf;"
| 37 || Dec 31 || Pittsburgh Penguins || 1–3 || Detroit Red Wings || Joe Louis Arena || 11–19–7 || 29
|-

|- style="background:#cfc;"
| 38 || Jan 3 || Detroit Red Wings || 4–6 || Pittsburgh Penguins || Civic Arena || 12–19–7 || 31
|- style="background:#fcf;"
| 39 || Jan 4 || Pittsburgh Penguins || 2–3 || Chicago Black Hawks || Chicago Stadium || 12–20–7 || 31
|- style="background:#cfc;"
| 40 || Jan 7 || New York Islanders || 3–7 || Pittsburgh Penguins || Civic Arena || 13–20–7 || 33
|- style="background:#fcf;"
| 41 || Jan 8 || Pittsburgh Penguins || 2–4 || Montreal Canadiens || Montreal Forum || 13–21–7 || 33
|- style="background:#fcf;"
| 42 || Jan 10 || Chicago Black Hawks || 5–3 || Pittsburgh Penguins || Civic Arena || 13–22–7 || 33
|- style="background:#fcf;"
| 43 || Jan 13 || Pittsburgh Penguins || 3–6 || New York Islanders || Nassau Veterans Memorial Coliseum || 13–23–7 || 33
|- style="background:#cfc;"
| 44 || Jan 14 || St. Louis Blues || 3–6 || Pittsburgh Penguins || Civic Arena || 14–23–7 || 35
|- style="background:#cfc;"
| 45 || Jan 17 || Los Angeles Kings || 4–5 || Pittsburgh Penguins || Civic Arena || 15–23–7 || 37
|- style="background:#fcf;"
| 46 || Jan 21 || Philadelphia Flyers || 5–0 || Pittsburgh Penguins || Civic Arena || 15–24–7 || 37
|- style="background:#cfc;"
| 47 || Jan 24 || Calgary Flames || 3–4 || Pittsburgh Penguins || Civic Arena || 16–24–7 || 39
|- style="background:#fcf;"
| 48 || Jan 27 || Pittsburgh Penguins || 1–7 || St. Louis Blues || The Checkerdome || 16–25–7 || 39
|- style="background:#cfc;"
| 49 || Jan 28 || Minnesota North Stars || 1–3 || Pittsburgh Penguins || Civic Arena || 17–25–7 || 41
|- style="background:#ffc;"
| 50 || Jan 31 || Washington Capitals || 4–4 || Pittsburgh Penguins || Civic Arena || 17–25–8 || 42
|-

|- style="background:#fcf;"
| 51 || Feb 2 || Pittsburgh Penguins || 4–8 || Chicago Black Hawks || Chicago Stadium || 17–26–8 || 42
|- style="background:#cfc;"
| 52 || Feb 4 || Pittsburgh Penguins || 3–2 || Winnipeg Jets || Winnipeg Arena || 18–26–8 || 44
|- style="background:#fcf;"
| 53 || Feb 6 || Pittsburgh Penguins || 4–6 || Colorado Rockies || McNichols Sports Arena || 18–27–8 || 44
|- style="background:#fcf;"
| 54 || Feb 7 || Pittsburgh Penguins || 4–5 || Calgary Flames || Stampede Corral || 18–28–8 || 44
|- style="background:#cfc;"
| 55 || Feb 12 || New York Islanders || 3–5 || Pittsburgh Penguins || Civic Arena || 19–28–8 || 46
|- style="background:#ffc;"
| 56 || Feb 14 || Vancouver Canucks || 2–2 || Pittsburgh Penguins || Civic Arena || 19–28–9 || 47
|- style="background:#fcf;"
| 57 || Feb 17 || Pittsburgh Penguins || 1–4 || Philadelphia Flyers || The Spectrum || 19–29–9 || 47
|- style="background:#cfc;"
| 58 || Feb 19 || Hartford Whalers || 2–6 || Pittsburgh Penguins || Civic Arena || 20–29–9 || 49
|- style="background:#fcf;"
| 59 || Feb 21 || Buffalo Sabres || 6–1 || Pittsburgh Penguins || Civic Arena || 20–30–9 || 49
|- style="background:#cfc;"
| 60 || Feb 22 || Colorado Rockies || 4–9 || Pittsburgh Penguins || Civic Arena || 21–30–9 || 51
|- style="background:#cfc;"
| 61 || Feb 25 || Winnipeg Jets || 3–4 || Pittsburgh Penguins || Civic Arena || 22–30–9 || 53
|- style="background:#cfc;"
| 62 || Feb 26 || Pittsburgh Penguins || 7–5 || Washington Capitals || Capital Centre || 23–30–9 || 55
|- style="background:#cfc;"
| 63 || Feb 28 || New York Rangers || 4–6 || Pittsburgh Penguins || Civic Arena || 24–30–9 || 57
|-

|- style="background:#cfc;"
| 64 || Mar 2 || Pittsburgh Penguins || 5–4 || Quebec Nordiques || Quebec Coliseum || 25–30–9 || 59
|- style="background:#cfc;"
| 65 || Mar 4 || Los Angeles Kings || 5–6 || Pittsburgh Penguins || Civic Arena || 26–30–9 || 61
|- style="background:#fcf;"
| 66 || Mar 7 || Pittsburgh Penguins || 5–8 || Minnesota North Stars || Met Center || 26–31–9 || 61
|- style="background:#cfc;"
| 67 || Mar 8 || Edmonton Oilers || 4–6 || Pittsburgh Penguins || Civic Arena || 27–31–9 || 63
|- style="background:#fcf;"
| 68 || Mar 11 || Montreal Canadiens || 2–1 || Pittsburgh Penguins || Civic Arena || 27–32–9 || 63
|- style="background:#ffc;"
| 69 || Mar 14 || Quebec Nordiques || 3–3 || Pittsburgh Penguins || Civic Arena || 27–32–10 || 64
|- style="background:#fcf;"
| 70 || Mar 16 || Pittsburgh Penguins || 6–7 || Edmonton Oilers || Northlands Coliseum || 27–33–10 || 64
|- style="background:#fcf;"
| 71 || Mar 17 || Pittsburgh Penguins || 3–4 || Vancouver Canucks || Pacific Coliseum || 27–34–10 || 64
|- style="background:#ffc;"
| 72 || Mar 19 || Pittsburgh Penguins || 4–4 || Los Angeles Kings || The Forum || 27–34–11 || 65
|- style="background:#cfc;"
| 73 || Mar 21 || Pittsburgh Penguins || 3–1 || Colorado Rockies || McNichols Sports Arena || 28–34–11 || 67
|- style="background:#cfc;"
| 74 || Mar 25 || Toronto Maple Leafs || 2–5 || Pittsburgh Penguins || Civic Arena || 29–34–11 || 69
|- style="background:#ffc;"
| 75 || Mar 28 || Pittsburgh Penguins || 4–4 || New York Islanders || Nassau Veterans Memorial Coliseum || 29–34–12 || 70
|- style="background:#fcf;"
| 76 || Mar 29 || Edmonton Oilers || 5–2 || Pittsburgh Penguins || Civic Arena || 29–35–12 || 70
|- style="background:#fcf;"
| 77 || Mar 31 || Pittsburgh Penguins || 1–5 || Quebec Nordiques || Quebec Coliseum || 29–36–12 || 70
|-

|- style="background:#ffc;"
| 78 || Apr 2 || Pittsburgh Penguins || 1–1 || Detroit Red Wings || Joe Louis Arena || 29–36–13 || 71
|- style="background:#fcf;"
| 79 || Apr 4 || Boston Bruins || 5–2 || Pittsburgh Penguins || Civic Arena || 29–37–13 || 71
|- style="background:#cfc;"
| 80 || Apr 5 || Pittsburgh Penguins || 5–4 || Hartford Whalers || XL Center || 30–37–13 || 73
|-

|- style="text-align:center;"
| Legend:       = Win       = Loss       = Tie

Playoffs
The Penguins lost in the Preliminary round (3-2) versus the St. Louis Blues.

Player statistics
Skaters

Goaltenders

†Denotes player spent time with another team before joining the Penguins.  Stats reflect time with the Penguins only.
‡Denotes player was traded mid-season.  Stats reflect time with the Penguins only.

Awards and records
 Ron Stackhouse became the first defenseman to score 300 points for the Penguins. He did so in a 7–9 loss to Hartford on November 26th.
 Randy Carlyle established a new franchise record for goals (16), assists (67) and points (83) by a defenseman in a season. He topped the previous highs of 15 goals (held by Ron Stackhouse and Darryl Edestrand), 60 assists and 71 points (both held by Ron Stackhouse).
 Rick Kehoe established a new franchise record for goals in a season with 55. He topped the previous high of 53 held by Pierre Larouche.

Transactions

The Penguins were involved in the following transactions during the 1980–81 season:

Trades

Additions and subtractions

Draft picks 

The 1980 NHL Entry Draft was held on June 11, 1980 in Montreal, Quebec.

References
 Penguins on Hockey Database

Pittsburgh Penguins seasons
Pittsburgh
Pittsburgh
Pitts
Pitts